Michael Kneissl is a German physicist and professor at the Institute of Solid State Physics at the Technical University of Berlin.

Kneissl received his doctoral degree in physics from the University of Erlangen–Nuremberg in 1996. During his graduate studies, he was also a visiting scholar at the University of California, Berkeley, in 1993. He joined the Xerox Palo Alto Research Center (PARC) in 1996. Since 2005, he has been a Full Professor and the Chair of Experimental Nanophysics and Photonics Group at the TU Berlin. He holds a joint appointment at the Ferdinand-Braun-Institut in Berlin, where he heads the GaN-Optoelectronics Lab. From 2011 to 2021 he was Executive Director of the Institute of Solid State Physics at TU Berlin.

His research interests include group III-nitride semiconductor materials, metalorganic vapour-phase epitaxy of wide-bandgap semiconductors and (In)AlGaN nanostructures as well as novel optoelectronic devices, including UV LEDs and laser diodes.

He was named Fellow of the Institute of Electrical and Electronics Engineers (IEEE) in 2016 for contributions to the development of wide bandgap semiconductor laser diodes and ultraviolet LEDs. He holds more than 60 patents in the area of group III-nitride device technologies.

Books
 with 
 with

References

External links
 
 

German physicists
Fellow Members of the IEEE
Living people
1966 births
Academic staff of the Technical University of Berlin
University of Erlangen-Nuremberg alumni